Makhdum Khusro Bakhtyar (born 7 July 1967) is a Pakistani politician who recently served as Pakistan's Federal Minister for Industries & Production. Previously, he has served as Federal Minister of Economic Affairs, Federal Minister of National Food Security and Research and Federal Minister for Planning, Development and Reforms in the PTI Government under the leadership of Prime Minister Imran Khan. He had been a member of the National Assembly of Pakistan from 2002 to 2008, 2013 to 2018 and 2018 till 2023.

Previously, he was a member of the Provincial Assembly of the Punjab from 1997 to 1999 and served as provincial advisor to the then Chief Minister, Shehbaz Sharif. During his first tenure as Member of the National Assembly, he served as Minister of State for Foreign Affairs from September 2004 to November 2007 in the Federal Cabinet of Prime Minister Shaukat Aziz.

Early life and education
Bakhtyar was born on 7 July 1967. He hails from Mian Wali Qureshian, a village in the Rahim Yar Khan District of Punjab and belongs to a prominent political family.

He graduated from the University of Punjab in 1990, and received an LLB (Hons.) degree  in 1994 from the London School of Economics and Political Science and a Bar-at-Law degree from Lincoln's Inn, United Kingdom in 1995.

Political career
Bakhtyar has been active in Pakistan's political arena from the late 1990s and remains a major player.

He was elected to the Provincial Assembly of the Punjab as a candidate of Pakistan Muslim League (N) (PML-N) from Constituency PP-236 (Rahim Yar Khan-V) in 1997 Pakistani general election. He received 19,736 votes and defeated Makhdoom Ashfaq Ahmad, a candidate of Pakistan Peoples Party (PPP).

He was elected to the National Assembly of Pakistan as a candidate of Pakistan Muslim League (Q) (PML-Q) from Constituency NA-194 (Rahim Yar Khan-III) in 2002 Pakistani general election. He received 70,116 votes and defeated Makhdoom Shahabuddin. In the same election, he also ran for the seat of the Provincial Assembly of the Punjab as a candidate of PML-Q from Constituency PP-291 (Rahim Yar Khan-VII) but was unsuccessful.

On 4 September 2004, he was inducted into the Federal Cabinet of Prime Minister Shaukat Aziz and was appointed as Minister of State for Foreign Affairs. He continued to serve as Minister of State for Foreign Affairs until 15 November 2007.

He ran for the seat of the National Assembly as a candidate of PML-Q from Constituency NA-194 (Rahim Yar Khan-III) in 2008 Pakistani general election, but was unsuccessful. He received 42,442 votes and lost the seat to Makhdoom Shahabuddin.

He was re-elected to the National Assembly as an independent candidate from Constituency NA-194 (Rahim Yar Khan-III) in 2013 Pakistani general election. He received 64,272 votes and defeated Makhdoom Shahabuddin. In the same election, he also ran for the seat of the National Assembly as an independent candidate from Constituency NA-195 (Rahim Yar Khan-IV) but was unsuccessful. He received 46,897 votes and lost the seat to Mustafa Mehmood. In the same election, he was re-elected to the Provincial Assembly of the Punjab as an independent candidate from Constituency PP-289 (Rahimyar Khan-V). He received 25,898 votes and defeated Mian Muhammad Aslam Advocate. Following the election, he abandoned his Punjab Assembly seat in favor of the National Assembly seat.

On 23 May 2013, he joined PML-N. In 2017 he was made Chairman House Standing Committee on Foreign Affairs

In March 2018, he became business partner of Jahangir Khan Tareen after they together purchased a sugar mill for Rs 27 billion. This triggered speculation that he might join PTI soon.

On 9 April 2018, Bakhtyar, together with seven other PML-N parliamentarians, quit the PML-N and formed a new group under the name of "Junoobi Punjab Suba Mahaaz". The group accused PML-N for ignoring the southern part of Punjab and demanded the creation of separate province for southern Punjab. On 30 April, he resigned from his National Assembly seat in protest.

On 9 May 2018, Junoobi Punjab Sooba Mahaaz (JPSM) merged with Pakistan Tehreek-e-Insaf (PTI) after the latter promised to create a South Punjab province on administrative grounds. Subsequently, Bakhtyar joined PTI after signing an agreement with PTI chairman Imran Khan on the promise of the creation of a South Punjab province and an equitable distribution of resources to the region.

He was re-elected to the National Assembly as a candidate of PTI from Constituency NA-177 (Rahim Yar Khan-III) in 2018 Pakistani general election after securing 100,768 votes.

On 18 August, Imran Khan formally announced his federal cabinet structure and Bakhtyar was named as Minister for Water Resources. However, on 20 August 2018, he was sworn in as Federal Minister for Planning, Development and Reforms in the federal cabinet of Prime Minister Imran Khan.
On 19 November 2019, he was appointed as Federal Minister for National Food Security and Research and served in that position until a perceived conflict of interest arose due to his sugar business, after which he resigned on 6 April 2020. He was appointed Minister of Economic Affairs after a cabinet reshuffle. After a year of holding the Economic Affairs portfolio, Bakhtiar was made Federal Minister of Industries & Production, a position which he held until the end of the Imran Khan government on 10th April, 2022. He was also appointed president for the Pakistan Tehreek-e-Insaf South Punjab chapter in December, 2021.

References

Living people
1969 births
Pakistani barristers
Pakistani MNAs 2013–2018
Pakistani MNAs 2002–2007
Pakistan Muslim League (Q) MNAs
Pakistan Muslim League (N) MNAs
Pakistan Tehreek-e-Insaf MNAs
University of the Punjab alumni
Ministers of State for Foreign Affairs of Pakistan
Alumni of the London School of Economics
Punjab MPAs 1997–1999
Pakistani MNAs 2018–2023